Avar Enakke Sontham is a 1977 Indian Tamil-language drama film directed by Pattu and written by Panchu Arunachalam. The film stars Jaishankar and Srividya.

Plot

Cast 
Jaishankar
Srividya
K. Vijayan
V. K. Ramasamy

Production 
The cinematography was done by T. S. Vinayagam and editing by B. Kandhasamy.

Soundtrack 
The soundtrack was composed by Ilaiyaraaja and lyrics were written by Panchu Arunachalam. The song "Devan Thiruchabai" was well received. The song "Surangani" was adapted from the Sri Lankan song of the same name.

Reception 
Kanthan of Kalki wrote in Panchu Arunachalam's story line, the character's different personalities make us wonder what will happen next. He also praised the performances of cast and added experience speaks for Pattu's direction but felt music was unappealing.

References

External links 
 

1970s Tamil-language films
1977 drama films
Films scored by Ilaiyaraaja
Films with screenplays by Panchu Arunachalam
Indian drama films